Antony Loewenstein (born 1974) is an Australian German freelance investigative journalist, author and film-maker.

Life
Loewenstein has written for The New York Times, The Guardian, Haaretz, The Washington Post, 
The New York Review of Books, Sydney Morning Herald, The Australian, Sydney's Sun-Herald, The Bulletin, ZNet, The Big Issue, Crikey, CounterPunch, and the online magazine New Matilda among others. He appears regularly on TV, radio, in public and at universities around the world discussing current affairs and politics.

Loewenstein contributed a chapter to Not Happy, John (2004), a best-seller in Australia which highlighted the growing disenchantment with then-PM John Howard. His book on the Israel-Palestine conflict, My Israel Question, (2006 and in new editions in 2007 and 2009) was described by Ilan Pappé as "one of the best treatises which presents in the most lucid way possible why anti-Zionism can not be equated with anti-Semitism". The Weekend Australian wrote that it "deserves a strong readership ... because it makes us uncomfortable". It was short-listed for a 2007 New South Wales Premier's Literary Award. The book was criticised in a review in Australian Jewish News.

His next book, The Blogging Revolution (2008), is about the impact of the internet in countries with repressive regimes. It was updated in 2011 after the Arab Spring. My Israel Question is available in an Arabic translation. He contributed to the Verso Books collection, A Time to Speak Out (2008), on the rise of global Jewish dissent.

He is the co-editor with Ahmed Moor of the 2012 book After Zionism: One State for Israel and Palestine which includes essays by Omar Barghouti, John Mearsheimer, Ilan Pappé, Sara Roy, and Jonathan Cook, among others. In 2012 he also published Left Turn about failures of capitalism.

Loewenstein's book on vulture capitalism, Profits of Doom was published in 2013 (a new edition followed in 2014) and a book on religion, faith and politics, For God's Sake. Verso Books published his Disaster Capitalism: Making A Killing Out of Catastrophe (2015), and he's the writer/co-producer of the documentary, Disaster Capitalism, released in 2018. His book on the global "war on drugs", Pills, Powder and Smoke: Inside the Bloody War on Drugs, was published in 2019 in the US, Australia and India and 2020 in the UK.

With South African film-maker Naashon Zalk, Loewenstein was co-director of a 2019 Al Jazeera English documentary on abuse of the opioid drug tramadol in Nigeria, West Africa's Opioid Crisis. He appears in the 2019 documentary, This Is Not A Movie, about The Independents Middle East correspondent, Robert Fisk.

Loewenstein co-founded the Independent Australian Jewish Voices (IAJV). He won the 2019 Jerusalem (Al Quds) Peace Prize, one of Australia's leading peace awards, for his work on Israel/Palestine.

He’s a contributor to the 2020 book, A Secret Australia: Revealed by the Wikileaks Exposes. He co-produced and co-wrote the podcast series, The Conspiracy Virus, on Covid-19, vaccines and climate change, with journalist Olivia Rosenman.

In 2021, he made the Al Jazeera English documentary with UK film-maker Dan Davies, Under the Cover of Covid, about threats to free speech and privacy during a global pandemic. 

He’s the co-creator of Twenty Years, an artistic and journalistic project on the legacy of the post 9/11 Afghan war, with Melbourne-based artist Tia Kass and Afghans around the world. Launched in 2021, it’ll take place in 2021 and 2022.

He co-founded Declassified Australia in 2021 with journalist Peter Cronau, an investigative website aiming to uncover Australia's often secretive, strategic relationship with the world. 

His book, The Palestine Laboratory: How Israel Exports the Technology of Occupation Around the World, is on how Israel's occupation has gone global and out in 2023. He's currently developing a range of documentary films.

Bibliography
Author
 

 
 
 
 

Contributor
 Kingston, Margo. Not Happy, John defending Australia's democracy. Paperback, 240 pages. Penguin Books, (2004) .

Editor
Antony Loewenstein, Ahmed Moor, eds. After Zionism: One State for Israel and Palestine, Saqi, (2012),

References

External links

 
 

1974 births
Living people
Australian atheists
Australian bloggers
Australian freelance journalists
Australian people of German-Jewish descent
Jewish anti-Zionism in Oceania
Jewish atheists
Jewish Australian writers
Journalists from Sydney
Writers from Sydney